Ronald Sukenick (July 14, 1932 – July 22, 2004) was an American writer and literary theorist.

Life
Sukenick was born and raised in Brooklyn, New York, where his father was a dentist. He graduated from Midwood High School and Cornell University before receiving his Ph.D. in English (with a dissertation on Wallace Stevens) from Brandeis University in 1962.

After Roland Barthes announced the "death of the author", Sukenick carried the metaphor even further in "the death of the novel". He drew up a list of what is missing: reality doesn't exist, nor time or personality. He was widely recognized as a controversial writer who, frequently humorously,  questioned and rejected the conventions of traditional fiction-writing. In novels, short stories, literary criticism and history, he often used himself, family members or friends as characters, sometimes quoting them in tape-recorded conversations. He did stints as writer in residence at Cornell, the University of California, Irvine and the Hebrew University of Jerusalem. But his books were never best-sellers. Sukenick once commented that he had "only forty fans, but they're all fanatics."

He referred to his career as a university professor as his "day job". Beginning in 1956, he taught at Brandeis, Cornell, Hofstra University, the City College of New York, Sarah Lawrence College, the University at Buffalo and Paul Valéry University Montpellier 3. His most prolonged teaching stint was at the University of Colorado Boulder, where he was a professor of English from 1975 to 1999. While at Colorado, he served as director of creative writing until 1977 and as director of the publications center from 1986 to 1999.
 
He was actively committed to publishing and promoting the writing of other unconventional writers. He was founder and publisher of the American Book Review and a founder of The Fiction Collective (now Fiction Collective Two). Sukenick was chairman of the Coordinating Council of Little magazines, and on the executive council of the Modern Language Association and the National Book Critics Circle.

His archive resides at the Harry Ransom Center at the University of Texas at Austin.

Family
He was divorced from Lynn Luria (Lynn Sukenick) in 1984. He lived with Julia Frey for many years, and they were formally married in 1992. Her book on Toulouse-Lautrec is now a standard work.  She collaborated on Sukenick's posthumously published story "For the Invisible, Against Thinking" set in Bali.

He died from the muscular disease inclusion body myositis, in 2004.

Works
 
 
 
 
 
 
 
 In Form : Digressions on the Act of Fiction (1985)
 
 
  autobiography
 
Degenerative Prose: Writing Beyond Category (1995) editor with Mark Amerika
In the Slipstream : An FC2 Reader (1999) editor with Curtis White
 
 
 
 Moving Ahead

Criticism

References

External links
Out
Sukenick web site
New York Times Obituary

See also
 Balcony View - a 9/11 Diary, by Julia Frey

1932 births
2004 deaths
20th-century American novelists
21st-century American novelists
American male novelists
Brandeis University alumni
Cornell University alumni
American Book Award winners
20th-century American male writers
21st-century American male writers